Autoscopy is the experience in which an individual perceives the surrounding environment from a different perspective, from a position outside of their own body.

Autoscopy has been of interest to humankind from time immemorial and is abundant in the folklore, mythology, and spiritual narratives of most ancient and modern societies. Cases of autoscopy are commonly encountered in modern psychiatric practice. According to neurological research, autoscopic experiences are hallucinations. Their root cause is unclear. Autoscopic experiences can include non-mirroring real-time images and the experiencer may be able to move.

Factors 
Experiences are characterized by the presence of the following three factors:
 disembodiment – an apparent location of the self outside one's body;
 impression of seeing the world from an elevated and distanced, but egocentric visuo-spatial perspective;
 impression of seeing one's own body from this perspective (autoscopy).

The autoscopic phenomenon is classified in the following six tipologies: autoscopic hallucination, he-autoscopy or heautoscopic proper, feeling of a presence, out of body experience, negative and inner forms of autoscopy.

Laboratory of Cognitive Neuroscience, École Polytechnique Fédérale de Lausanne, Lausanne, and Department of Neurology, University Hospital, Geneva, Switzerland, have reviewed some of the classical precipitating factors of autoscopy. These are sleep, drug abuse, and general anesthesia as well as neurobiology. They have compared them with recent findings on neurological and neurocognitive mechanisms of autoscopy; the reviewed data suggest that autoscopic experiences are due to functional disintegration of lower-level multisensory processing and abnormal higher-level self-processing at the temporoparietal junction.

Related disorders 
Heautoscopy is a term used in psychiatry and neurology for the reduplicative hallucination of "seeing one's own body at a distance". It can occur as a symptom in schizophrenia and epilepsy. Heautoscopy is considered a possible explanation for doppelgänger phenomena.

The term polyopic heautoscopy refers to cases where more than one double is perceived. In 2006, Peter Brugger and his colleagues described the case of a man who experienced five doubles resulting from a tumor in the insular region of his left temporal lobe.

Another related autoscopy disorder is known as negative autoscopy (or negative heautoscopy) a psychological phenomenon in which the affected person does not see their reflection when looking in a mirror. Although their image may be seen by others, they claim not to see it.

See also 
 Syndrome of subjective doubles

References

Further reading
 Bhaskaran, R; Kumar, A; Nayar, K. K. (1990). Autoscopy in hemianopic field. Journal of Neurology, Neurosurgery, and Psychiatry: 53 1016–1017.
 Blanke, O; Landis, T; Seeck, M. (2004). Out-of-body experience and autoscopy of neurological origin. Brain 127: 243–258.
 Brugger, P. (2002). Reflective mirrors: Perspective-taking in autoscopic phenomena. Cognitive Neuropsychiatry 7: 179–194.
 Brugger, P; Regard, M; Landis, T. (1996). Unilaterally felt "presences": the neuropsychiatry of one's invisible doppelgänger. Neuropsychiatry, Neuropsychology, and Behavioral Neurology 9: 114–122.
 Devinsky, O., Feldmann, E., Burrowes, K; Bromfield, E. (1989). Autoscopic phenomena with seizures. Archives of Neurology 46: 1080–1088.
 Lukianowicz, N. (1958). Autoscopic phenomena. Archives of Neurology and Psychiatry 80: 199–220.

External links 
 Topic and releases – website

Epilepsy
Neurology
Schizophrenia
Symptoms and signs of mental disorders